Hyundai Engineering (HEC) or Hyundai Engineering Co. is a company established in 1974, that does engineering work covering the entire project life cycle, including feasibility study, basic and detailed design, procuring, commissioning and operation, and maintenance.

HEC provides comprehensive engineering and construction services for plant and infrastructure projects including building and housing work.

Major affiliates

 Hyundai Engineering & Construction
 Hyundai Motor Company
 Kia Motors

Overseas branch offices
-Asia
 Hyundai Engineering China
 Hyundai Engineering Rizhao, China
 Hyundai Engineering Shanghai, China
 Hyundai Engineering India
 Hyundai Engineering Indonesia
 Hyundai Engineering Malaysia
 Hyundai Engineering Cambodia
 Hyundai Engineering Vietnam
 Hyundai Engineering Turkmenistan
 Hyundai Engineering Uzbekistan

-Middle East
 Hyundai Engineering UAE
 Hyundai Engineering Iran

-Europe
 Hyundai Engineering Russia
 Hyundai Engineering Germany
 Hyundai Engineering Slovakia
 Hyundai Engineering Turkey
 Hyundai Engineering Czech Republic

-America
 Hyundai Engineering United States of America
 Hyundai Engineering Brazil
 Hyundai Engineering Mexico
 Hyundai Engineering Co. Ltd. Sucursal Colombia

-Africa
 Hyundai Engineering Algeria

History

 December 1973 – Registered as a vendor at the Korean Ministry of Science and Technology (For plant engineering, specialty technology service)
 February 1974 – Established Hyundai Technology Development Co., Ltd.
 November 1980 – Merged with Halla Engineering Co., Ltd
 March 1982 – Changed the name to “Hyundai Engineering Co., Ltd”
 January 1985 – Performed overseas consulting projects as the first private company in Korea (i.e. 5th and 6th electricity projects in Nepal)
 April 1991 – Receive “”Iron tower order of industrial service” on the 24th World Science Day (한국어보고)
 May 1996 – Received award by the Minister of Government Administration and Home Affairs for “the second award for innovative Management for the private and public sectors” (Korea Chamber of Commerce & Industry, ministry of Government Administration and Home Affairs.
 September 1996 – Received award by the Prime Minister for “The environmental technology award” (Ministry of Government Administration and Home Affairs)
 May 1999 – Merging with Hyundai Engineering & Construction
 January 2001 – Separated from Hyundai Engineering & Construction
 June 2001 – Moved to the new office in Mok-dong
 November 2001 – Established the research institute
 December 2003 – Increased of capital to 18.9 billion Korean won (participation in the share of Korea Development Bank)
 June 2004 – Received an award from the Minister of Commerce, Industry and Energy  for “The First National Environment – Friendly Management Award”
 December 2005 – Declared the new vision of the company “HEC 2010”
 January 2007 – Inauguration of the CEO, Joong Kyum KIM
 April 2007 – Hyundai Engineering was awarded the prize of “Civil Engineering Structure” of the year
 June 2007 – Hyundai Engineering was awarded for “2007 National Environmental Prize”
 July 2008 – Reorganization of Hyundai Engineering (HEC)
 February 2009 – 35th anniversary of Hyundai Engineering Co. Ltd & the pronouncement for the VISION 2015
 March 2009 – Inauguration of the new CEO Dong Wook KIM, won the first prize in Engineering Section at “2009 Overseas Construction”, Won the Golden Medal at this year’s “Top Civil Engineering Structure” with Ma-Chang Great Bridge
 October 2009 – Won the “10th Grand Prize of Korea Financial management” (Major Corporate Field) & Hyundai Engineering won the “Prize of Minister of the Environment” in the Merit Award Ceremony of Building Environment-Friendly Industry & Low Carbon- Green Growth
 December 2009 – Awarded a billion-dollar project in Turkmenistan “gas Desulfurization Plant”
 March 2010 – Hyundai Engineering, awarded for the “Tin Tower Order of Industrial Service Merit for the Tax Payer’s Day”
 August 2010 – Ranks 69th of the top 200 international design firms in the world
 April 2011 – Incorporated into Hyundai Motor Group
 June 2011 – Inauguration of the new CEO Wee Chul Kim (President & CEO)
 July 2011 – Ranks 54th of the top 200 international design firms in the world
 January 2012 – Ranks 1st on the Amount of global contract won among Korean construction firms in 2011
 July 2012 – Ranks 47th of the top 225 international design firms
 July 2013 – Ranks 36th of the top 225 international design firms
 December 2013 – Awarded Export Tower of 2 Billion Dollars on the 50th Day of Trade
 April 2014 – Merged with Hyundai Amco
 October 2014 – Credit ratings upgraded to 'AA-'
 August 2015 – Ranks 26th of the top 225 international design firms in the world 
 November 2015 – Acquired ISO 27001 Certificates
 June 2016 – Awarded both ‘Golden Valve Award’ and ‘Platinum Pipe Award' at 2016 Intergraph Awards
 July 2016 – Ranks 21st of the top 225 international design firms in the world
 March 2016 – Awarded a 2.93 billion-dollar project in Kuwait "Al-Zour LNG Import Terminal”
 September 2016 – Successfully completed the KMM Complete-Auto Plant in Mexico
 July 2017 – Ranks 24th of the top 225 international design firms in the world
 February 2017 – Inauguration of the new CEO Sang Rok Sung (President & CEO)
 September 2017 – Turkmenistan TACE Site Achieves 60 Million Injury-Free Manhours
 November 2017 – HEC Uzbekistan office wins the Presidential Commendation for Global CSR in ‘The 5th Most Beloved Companies in Korea Awards’ 
 December 2017 – Receives Commendation Award from the President of the Republic of Korea during “The Korean Government’s Rewarding of Those Who Have Contributed to Creating Jobs”
 July 2018 – Ranks 29th of the top 225 international design firms in the world
 August 2018 Ranks sixth in the 2018 construction capability assessment, whose results were announced by the Ministry of Land, Infrastructure and Transport (MOLIT)

See also

 Economy of South Korea
 List of South Korean companies

References

External links
 Hyundai Engineering  Hikot Page
 HYUNDAI CONGLOMERATES OF KOREA 
 Hyundai Engineering  website
 Hyundai Engineering  website
 Hyundai Engineering  Blog Page

Construction and civil engineering companies of South Korea
Recipients of the Order of Industrial Service Merit
Hyundai Motor Group
Construction and civil engineering companies established in 1974
South Korean companies established in 1974